NSAPI may refer to:
Netscape Server Application Programming Interface, a technology for extending web server software
(May be confused with NPAPI, another Netscape technology)
Network Service Access Point Identifier, an identifier used in cellular data networks